The Anglican Diocese of Ibadan South is one of 17 within the Anglican Province of Ibadan, itself one of 14 provinces within the Church of Nigeria. The current bishop is Akintunde Popoola.

The first bishop of the diocese was Jacob Ajetunmobi, who was Bishop from 1999 until his retirement in 2018.

Notes

Church of Nigeria dioceses
Dioceses of the Province of Ibadan